Filip Neusser (born September 16, 1981 in Prague, Czech Republic) is a former Czech professional field hockey goalkeeper.

Playing career, awards and honors

Neusser started playing hockey in Prague at the age of six. At 16 he was named the best goalkeeper during the U21 indoor European Championships in 1998. 

Neusser, who has more than 150 caps, has represented the Czech Republic since 1997 and started his professional career in 2003 in Germany. Playing for the Czech National team, he was voted the best goalkeeper of the tournament during the World Cup qualification and 3 times during the European championships division B. In 2013 he had the chance to show his skills in Boom (Belgium) during the European Championships where he was also named the best goalkeeper of the tournament. 

He played for East Grinstead Hockey Club in England.  Neusser is a double indoor Champion of England hockey league.  He was also voted Man of the Match during the Wembley Final in 2014. 
Neusser is considered one of the best goalkeepers in the world in general and the best goalkeeper in the world in indoor field hockey.

Regular season clubs

Personal life

Neusser lives in Prague and he has two daughters.

References

External links
Czech TV - Czech field hockey star prevailed in England 
Czech TV - Hockey on the ground - Hockey magazine from the Czech Republic and abroad 
Hockey: Filip Neusser loving life in England 
FN Brand

1981 births
Sportspeople from Prague
Czech male field hockey players
Living people
Male field hockey goalkeepers
East Grinstead Hockey Club players
Mannheimer HC players